Volnei Feltes (born 15 April 2000) is a Brazilian professional footballer who plays as a defender for Portuguese club Oliveirense on loan from Estoril.

Club career
Volnei began playing football with Juventude, before moving to the youth academy of  Internacional in 2015. He moved to Portugal with Estoril on 23 July 2020. He helped their U23 side win the Liga Revelação Sub 23 for the 2020–21 season. He made his professional debut with Estoril in a 0–0 Primeira Liga tie with Paços de Ferreira on 31 January 2022.

References

External links
 
 
 Liga Portugal profile

2000 births
Living people
Sportspeople from Rio Grande do Sul
Brazilian footballers
G.D. Estoril Praia players
Primeira Liga players
U.D. Oliveirense players
Liga Portugal 2 players
Brazilian expatriate footballers
Brazilian expatriate sportspeople in Portugal
Expatriate footballers in Portugal
Association football defenders